Justin Lee Collins (born 28 July 1974) is an actor and former radio and television presenter from Bristol, England.

Collins began his career as a stand up comedian in the 1990s when he was in his late teens. He then presented a number of TV shows. From 2003 to 2005 he hosted his own radio show on XFM. He was one of the duo presenting The Sunday Night Project (previously named The Friday Night Project), appearing alongside Alan Carr for Channel 4. He also hosted numerous specials on Channel 4 entitled 'Bring Back...', reuniting the cast and crew from shows and films such as Dallas, Star Wars, The A-Team and Fame. He then took on challenges to become a Mexican wrestler, a surfer, a ballroom dancer, a ten-pin bowler, a high diver and a West End star. He later became a real West End star in Rock of Ages.

In 2014 Collins starred in the comedy/horror feature film The Hatching alongside Thomas Turgoose and Andrew Potts, and in 2015 he played a small role in the time-travel comedy Time Slips.

In 2012 he was convicted of harassing an ex-girlfriend.

Early life
Collins was born on 28 July 1974 in Southmead, Bristol, to Anita and Danny Collins. His father was a self-employed electrician. Collins is an only child. In 1990, he left education at Speedwell Secondary School aged 15 with no qualifications and started working at Marks & Spencer as a warehouseman.

Career

Comedy and theatre
Collins began his career in entertainment as a stand-up comic whilst still working part-time as a double-glazing window demonstrator. He won the Best New Comedy Act award at the Glastonbury Festival in 1997 and reached the finals of the BBC New Comedy Awards at the Edinburgh Fringe Festival the same year. Collins gave up stand-up comedy in 2002 to concentrate on TV and radio presenting, stating he intended to never return to the profession.

In 2007 and 2010, Collins won the category Funniest Man at Loaded'''s Lafta awards.

In 2008 Collins appeared as Amos Hart in the hit show Chicago, for which he rehearsed at the Cambridge Theatre. Collins said of the role, "I'm over the moon to be playing the sexiest part in the best show on the West End stage. I've already gone through a dozen pairs of tights."

From August 2011 to September 2012 Collins played Dennis Dupree in the West End production of Rock of Ages.

In 2013, Collins made a one-night-only return to stand-up comedy when he participated in "What’s the Fuss?", an event organised by Helen Lederer.

Radio
Collins began hosting a radio show on XFM in 2003, initially on Sundays at 1 to 3 am, later progressing to Saturday afternoons from 3 to 6 pm. He left in December 2005 and returned to host the Saturday 2 to 6 pm slot during April 2011. On 17 September that year, Collins sat in for Dermot O'Leary's Saturday show on BBC Radio 2. Collins was heard performing a Tom Jones impersonation on BBC Radio 1's Chris Moyles show in January 2008.

In 2014, Collins returned to radio with his own weekly show on Fubar Radio, an uncensored station featuring Andy Parsons and Mark Dolan. The show is also available via iTunes in podcast form.

Television and film

In 2002, Collins made shows for Bravo and MTV and became the host of the companion show for the first series of Strictly Come Dancing. He was replaced by Claudia Winkleman the following year and the show moved from BBC Three to BBC Two.

In 2005 and 2006, Collins presented The Games: Live At Trackside on E4 alongside Caroline Flack. The series was the companion show to Channel 4's sports-based reality programme The Games.

He was one of the presenters of Channel 4 and Paramount's Flipside TV.

He fronted a series for Channel 4 entitled The Convention-Crasher, aired in late 2007 and early 2008, in which he learned skills such as clowning and ventriloquism in an attempt to win prizes at professional conventions.

On 7 May 2007, he was a guest presenter on The New Paul O'Grady Show on Channel 4 when O'Grady took a break. Collins appeared on Top Gear with Alan Carr on 22 June 2008, for the Star in a Reasonably-Priced Car segment.

In June 2008, a show was aired on Sky One entitled Justin Lee Collins: 180, which followed his quest to be a professional darts player. In the show, he practised with Keith Deller and played in the BDO International Open on 15 June 2008. He lost in the first round 3-0 in legs to county player Stuart Bousfield, who was in the top 100 in the BDO rankings at the time.

He signed a £3 million deal with ITV for a show which focused on topical issues, but with a comedic twist, titled The Justin Lee Collins Show on ITV2 which ran from March to May 2009. That year he became the host of the Sky 1 show Oops tv, which shows home videos of people doing stupid things and things going badly wrong. That August he appeared on JLC Is, a six-part series on Sky 1 HD depicting the comedian taking on challenges to become a Mexican wrestler, a surfer, a ballroom dancer, a ten-pin bowler, a high diver and a West End star. The following month on 11 September, whilst being interviewed on BBC Radio 1's Chris Moyles Show it was announced Collins had signed an exclusive deal with Channel 5, and he confirmed he would therefore not be making another series of The Justin Lee Collins Show for ITV2. On joining Five he hosted the game show Heads Or Tails, where players could win up to £1m by correctly calling coin flips, and a chat show called Good Times which was cancelled due to poor viewing figures.

In  Justin Lee Collins: The Wrestler, Collins trains for 10 days in Mexico with a Mexican transvestite Luchador (Mexican wrestler) who fights under the name Cassandro, as an exotico. Justin adopts a rudo (bad guy) Luchador persona, El Glorioso, or the Glorious Lee One, with his own wrestling mask. His persona is given the blessing of El Hijo del Santo (The Son of Saint). Returning to London, Justin fights Cassan Dro in a Lucha libre event in the Roundhouse, ultimately losing and being unmasked.

In 2014, Collins was cast in British feature film The Hatching as Stan. It was directed by Michael Anderson. Collins stars alongside Andrew Potts and Thomas Turgoose. The following year he had a bit part in time-travel comedy Time Slips, directed by Stephen Hyams.

In August 2016 Collins made a return to TV, four years after his conviction, becoming a regular presenter on FanTV. The show attracted a small audience and was cancelled a few months later.

Music
After failing to be chosen to represent the United Kingdom in the 2010 Eurovision Song Contest, on 22 January 2010 Collins announced on RTÉ's The Late Late Show his intention to seek the nomination to represent Ireland. His proposed song was written by Boyzone star Ronan Keating. RTÉ confirmed on 9 February 2010 the song had not been shortlisted for the Irish final.

In 2007, Collins signed a three-album deal with Universal. Due to other commitments the first album was never released and subsequently the deal was called off. Collins stated in an interview with Reveal magazine (2012) he would like to resume his efforts to release music in the future.

Writing
In September 2009 Collins' autobiography Good Times!'' was published by Ebury Press. An audiobook followed.

Personal life

Marriage and children
In 2003, Collins married Karen Lee. She gave birth to their first child, a boy, in May 2005. In January 2008, Collins announced his wife had recently given birth to their second son. Collins separated from his wife in late 2010.

Harassment conviction

In November 2010, Justin Collins began a relationship with Anna Larke. After their break-up, Collins was charged with harassment of Larke under Section 4 of the Protection from Harassment Act 1997 (harassment causing fear of violence), and was subsequently tried at St Albans Crown Court, where he was sentenced to 140 hours of community service and to pay £3,500 prosecution costs. 

Following the trial he sought help from a psychotherapist.

Television credits

References

External links

1974 births
Living people
English male comedians
English television presenters
People convicted of harassment
Television personalities from Bristol
20th-century English comedians
21st-century English comedians